George Lockett Edwards III (July 19, 1924 – November 27, 1991), the son of George Lockett Edwards Jr. and Columbia Maypole, was an American producer and writer best known for his work with Curtis Harrington.

Select Credits
Voyage to the Prehistoric Planet (1965)
Queen of Blood (1966)
How Awful About Allan (1970)
What's the Matter with Helen? (1971)
Frogs (1972)
Harper Valley PTA (1978)
Chattanooga Choo Choo (1984)

References

External links

American film producers
1924 births
1991 deaths
20th-century American businesspeople